Eupithecia amicula is a moth in the family Geometridae first described by Vladimir G. Mironov and Anthony Charles Galsworthy in 2005. It is found in south-western and western Chinese provinces of Sichuan, Yunnan and Shaanxi.

The wingspan is about 18–20 mm. The forewings are pale grey brown and the hindwings are grey white.

References

Moths described in 2005
amicula
Moths of Asia